Isabel Garcia may refer to:

 María García (canoeist) (born 1978), Spanish sprint canoer
 Isabel Garcia (clothing), a clothing brand
 Isabel Garcia (dentist), American dentist
 Isabel García Muñoz, politician
 Isabel Salinas Garcia